Campamento may refer to:

Campamento, Honduras
Campamento, Uruguay
Campamento, Antioquia, in Colombia
Campamento (Chile), a term given in Chile to shanty towns
Campamento (Madrid), a barrio of Latina, Madrid, Spain
Campamento (Madrid Metro), a railway station
Campamento (San Roque), a village and district of San Roque, Cádiz, Andalucia, Spain